Jason Andrè Juami (born 27 January 1998), better known by his stage name Jay1 (stylised as JAY1), is a British rapper and songwriter who is from Coventry. He is of Congolese ancestry. He has had two top 20 singles in the UK.

Jay1 is best known for his single "Your Mrs", which was released in March 2019. He released his debut EP titled One Wave on 4 July 2019.

Early life
Before his keen interest in music, Jay1 undertook a PESS apprenticeship with local Coventry apprenticeship provider SCCU.

He started taking music seriously in 2016, when he moved to Coventry from Southgate, North London.

Discography

Extended plays

Singles

Guest appearances

References

1997 births
Living people
Black British male rappers
English male rappers
Musicians from Coventry
British people of Jamaican descent